The Duchy of Saxe-Eisenberg was one of the Saxon Duchies held by the Ernestine line of the Wettin Dynasty.

History
Established in 1680 for Christian, fifth son of Ernest I, Duke of Saxe-Gotha, the Duchy consisted of Eisenberg and the towns of Ronneburg, Roda and Camburg. Upon his death in April 1707, as he had no male heirs, the lands were passed to Saxe-Hildburghausen.

Dukes of Saxe-Eisenberg 
 Christian (1680–1707)

References

Citations

Books

1680 establishments in the Holy Roman Empire
1707 disestablishments in the Holy Roman Empire
States and territories established in 1680
Eisenberg